Pablo Maximiliano Barzola (born 17 November 1983 in San Martín) is an Argentine football full back, who plays for Fernando Cáceres FC.

Career
Barzola started his professional career with Argentinos Juniors in 2001 in the Primera División Argentina, the club were relegated in 2002, but he stayed with them.

In 2003, Barzola was selected to play for Argentina in the Pan American Games.

In 2004, Barzola joined River Plate but never established himself as a regular in the first team. In 2005, he joined Quilmes before returning to Argentinos in 2006.

On 4 June 2008, Barzola signed with Stade Malherbe de Caen in French Ligue 1.

References

External links
 Argentine Primera statistics at Fútbol XXI  
 Pablo Barzola at BDFA

1983 births
Living people
People from San Martín, Buenos Aires
Argentine footballers
Argentine expatriate footballers
Association football defenders
Argentinos Juniors footballers
Club Atlético River Plate footballers
Quilmes Atlético Club footballers
Stade Malherbe Caen players
All Boys footballers
Gimnasia y Tiro footballers
Guaraní Antonio Franco footballers
Argentine Primera División players
Primera Nacional players
Torneo Federal A players
Torneo Argentino A players
Torneo Argentino B players
Ligue 1 players
Ligue 2 players
Expatriate footballers in France
Argentine expatriate sportspeople in France
Pan American Games medalists in football
Pan American Games gold medalists for Argentina
Footballers at the 2003 Pan American Games
Medalists at the 2003 Pan American Games
Sportspeople from Buenos Aires Province
21st-century Argentine people